The Battle of Al Mahbes was fought on 14 October 1979 during the war in Western Sahara. The Polisario Front annihilated a battalion of the Royal Moroccan Armed Forces.

Background 

The town of Al Mahbes is defended by a battalion of the 14th motorized infantry regiment of the Moroccan army, about 780 men.

The garrison included an artillery battery, BGM-71 TOW anti-tank missiles and an armoured squadron, including 8 AMX-13 tanks (4 of which were present on the day of the attack).

After the attack on Smara, the Polisario forces who retreated to their bases in Algeria decided to attack the garrison of Al Mahbes.

Around ten Polisario units took part in the attack, i.e. around 1,200 men.

Battle
The attack is launched at 6:00 a.m. Around noon, all Moroccan defensive lines were taken by the Polisario, and the last Moroccan resistance was broken at around 4 pm. The Moroccan Air Force intervened. During the day of the 15th, the Saharawis pursued the fleeing Moroccans and blocked Moroccan reinforcements. Part of the garrison, including its commander Captain Mohamed Sakka, managed to withdraw to the town of Zag. Both sides are said to have run out of ammunition.

Casualties and consequences

According to the Polisario, 767 Moroccan soldiers were killed. Journalists who came to the scene counted 132 Moroccan corpses. The Polisario also presented 53 prisoners to journalists. 
According to Moroccan reports, 20% of the soldiers of the garrison have been killed and the number of wounded is even higher.

According to Morocco, the assailants deplore 350 dead and 75 vehicles destroyed, but journalists can come and visit the base conquered by the Polisario the day after the attack.

400 tonnes of weapons of all kinds, including a BGM-71 TOW anti-tank missile, were captured by the Polisario Front following this attack.

References

Sources

External links 
 
 
 
 

History of Western Sahara
Al Mahbes 1979
Al Mahbes 1979
1979 in Africa
Al Mahbes 1979
1979 in Morocco